Daniel Novikov (born June 6, 1989) is an Estonian track cyclist, who specialized in the individual sprint events.

Novikov was born in Tallinn.  He represented Estonia at the 2008 Summer Olympics in Beijing, and competed in the men's sprint track cycling. Novikov, however, failed to qualify for the latter rounds of the competition, as he placed twenty-first in the overall standings, with a time of 11.817 seconds, and a speed of 64.360 km/h. He also won gold and silver medals for sprint and keirin events, in the elite-B category of the 2007 UCI World Track Championships in Cape Town, South Africa.

References

External links

 
NBC 2008 Olympics profile

1989 births
Living people
Sportspeople from Tallinn
Estonian male cyclists
Cyclists at the 2008 Summer Olympics
Olympic cyclists of Estonia
Estonian people of Russian descent